Anne Bignan (1795–1861) was a French poet and translator, known for his translations of Homer. His father, Jean-Louis-Dominique Bigna de Coyrol, raised Bignan in Paris. Bigna published his first translations of Homer in 1819 and won numerous prizes in France in the following years. He is buried in the Père-Lachaise Cemetery in Paris.

1795 births
1861 deaths
Writers from Lyon
French male poets
19th-century French poets
19th-century French translators
19th-century French male writers
Chevaliers of the Légion d'honneur
French male non-fiction writers
Translators of Homer